Dyschirius subcylindricus is a species of ground beetle in the subfamily Scaritinae. It was described by Victor Motschulsky in 1849.

References

subcylindricus
Beetles described in 1849